Gordon Douglas McIntosh (29 May 1925 – 10 March 2019) was a Scottish-born Australian politician.

Early life 
Born in Glasgow, he was a toolmaker and served in the Royal Air Force from 1946 to 1948. Having moved to Australia, he was president of the Western Australian branch of the Amalgamated Engineering Union, and later, following its amalgamation, Vice-President of the Western Australian branch of the Amalgamated Metal Workers Union. In 1974, he was elected to the Australian Senate as a Labor Senator for Western Australia. He held the seat until his retirement in 1987.

References

Australian Labor Party members of the Parliament of Australia
Members of the Australian Senate for Western Australia
Members of the Australian Senate
Recipients of the Order of Timor-Leste
British emigrants to Australia
1925 births
2019 deaths
20th-century Australian politicians